Kedr Novouralsk was an ice hockey team in Novouralsk, Russia. They played in the Pervaya Liga, the third level of Russian ice hockey. The club was founded in 1967 and ceased to exist in 2014.

External links
 Kedr Novouralsk on eurohockey.com

Ice hockey teams in Russia
Ice hockey clubs disestablished in 2014
Ice hockey clubs established in 1967
1967 establishments in Russia
2014 disestablishments in Russia
Sport in Sverdlovsk Oblast